Douglass Township is a township in Butler County, Kansas, USA.  As of the 2000 census, its population was 2,306.

History
Douglass Township was organized in 1874. The township was named for Captain Joseph Douglass, a pioneer settler.

Geography
According to the USGS, it contains one cemetery, Douglass.

The stream of Little Walnut River runs through this township.

Further reading

References

 USGS Geographic Names Information System (GNIS)

External links
 City-Data.com

Townships in Butler County, Kansas
Townships in Kansas